Nimbus, from the Latin for "dark cloud", is an outdated term for the type of cloud now classified as the nimbostratus cloud. Nimbus also may refer to:

Arts and entertainment
 Halo (religious iconography), also known as Nimbus, a ring of light surrounding a person in a piece of art
 Nimbus (literary magazine), published in London (1951–58)
 Nimbus 2000, a flying broom from the Harry Potter series
 Nimbus, a spaceship captained by Zapp Brannigan in the animated series Futurama
 Nimbus III, a planet in the movie Star Trek V: The Final Frontier
 Nimbus, a character in the video game Tornado Outbreak
 Nimbus, a type of guided missile in the video game Ace Combat 6: Fires of Liberation
 Nimbus, a flying cloud from the Dragon Ball series
 Mr. Nimbus, Rick's arch-nemesis in the series Rick and Morty
"Nimbus", a song by 808 State featured on their 1992 single "Timebomb" and also featured on their 1993 album Gorgeous

Business
 Nimbus Communications Limited, an Indian media and entertainment company and sports broadcaster
 Nimbus Data, a flash memory-based storage systems company in San Francisco, California
 Nimbus Film, Denmark 's third largest film production company
 Nimbus Publishing, a Canadian company
 Nimbus Records, a British company specializing in classical music recordings 
 Nimbus School of Recording Arts, a private educational institute in Vancouver, Canada
 Nimsoft, originally Nimbus Software, a software vendor established in Oslo, Norway, later acquired by CA Inc.
 Nimbus Rooftop Bar, a bar in Bendigo, Australia

Places
 Nimbus Hills, Ellsworth Mountains, Antarctica
 Nimbus Dam, on the American River near Folsom, California

Science and computing
 Halo (optical phenomenon), also known as nimbus, produced by ice crystals in the sky
 Nimbus program, satellites for meteorological research
 RM Nimbus, a 1980s British microcomputer
 Nimbus (cipher), an encryption algorithm 
 Nimbus (cloud computing), an open-source software toolkit for running an infrastructure as a service
 Nimbus Mono, a monospaced typeface created by URW++
 Nimbus Note, a cross-platform note-taking app created by Nimbus Web Inc
 Nimbus Sans, a sans-serif typeface created by URW++
 Nimbus Roman, a serif typeface created by URW++

Transportation
 Nimbus 42, a Swedish sailboat design
 Nimbus (motorcycle), a Danish produced motorcycle manufactured in 1919–1928 and 1934–1960
 Mitsubishi Nimbus, one name for the Mitsubishi Chariot automobile
 Schempp-Hirth HS-3 Nimbus, a family of high-performance, open-class sailplanes
 Mitchell Nimbus, a series of American gliders
 Short Nimbus, a British two-seat glider trainer designed in 1947
 Akaflieg Braunschweig SB-7 Nimbus, a German glider of the 1960s
 Bristol Siddeley Nimbus, later Rolls-Royce Nimbus, a British turboshaft engine used in helicopters
 ADC Nimbus, a British inline aero engine that first ran in 1926
 Albion Nimbus, an ultra-lightweight midibus or coach chassis
 Caetano Nimbus, a bus body produced in England between 1999 and 2007
 Wright Nimbus, a minibus body

Other uses
 Nimbus (horse), multiple horses with this name
 Nimbus (technical festival), an Indian student technical festival
 Nimbus (beetle), a genus of beetles in the family aphodiidae